Charisma Records (also known as The Famous Charisma Label) was a British record label founded in 1969 by former journalist Tony Stratton-Smith. He had previously acted as manager for rock bands such as The Nice, the Bonzo Dog Band and Van der Graaf Generator. Gail Colson was label manager and joint managing director.

The label's most successful acts were Genesis, Peter Gabriel, Julian Lennon, and Monty Python. The first release was an LP by Rare Bird, in (probably) November 1969, and this group gave Charisma its first hit single, Sympathy, in early 1970. (Sympathy was a reworking of Giazotto's 'reconstruction' of Albinoni's Adagio.)

Charisma's first UK label was a distinctive magenta scroll design (though it is generally referred to in record collecting circles as "pink scroll") – magenta was the colour that Stratton Smith chose to represent the label, and this was reflected in his later horseracing colours, red for Manchester United, green for Brazil, and magenta for Charisma. Its second logo (used beginning in 1972) of Sir John Tenniel's drawing of the Mad Hatter (sometimes combined with a montage of other images from Alice's Adventures in Wonderland) made the label instantly recognizable. Much of the early distinctive artwork used by the label was created by Paul Whitehead. Whitehead's original illustrations for three Genesis albums were stolen from the Charisma archives when it was sold to Virgin Records in 1983. Whitehead claimed that Charisma staff got wind of the imminent sale and proceeded to loot its office.

The label also released material by The Nice, Robert John Godfrey, Lindisfarne and Alan Hull, Hawkwind, The Alan Parsons Project, Clifford T. Ward, String Driven Thing, Jack The Lad, Audience, Vivian Stanshall, Brand X, Sir John Betjeman, Malcolm McLaren and Afraid of Mice. 1970s solo albums of Peter Hammill, Tony Banks and Steve Hackett were also on Charisma.

Gail Colson left Charisma in the late 1970s to form her own management company, Gailforce.

In 1983, Charisma Records was acquired by Virgin Records and continued to operate until 1986, when Virgin absorbed the label. Virgin's purchase by EMI, then known as Thorn EMI, occurred in 1992. A new version of Charisma, with no connection to the original label other than the name, operated between 1990 and 1992, with a street-oriented and independently distributed subsidiary called Cardiac Records. Some Charisma Records recordings were re-issued on the EMI label. In the UK, the label was revived by EMI's Angel Records in 2007.

With most of EMI's purchase by Universal Music Group, Charisma returned to Virgin Records.

Distribution
Charisma was initially manufactured and distributed in the United Kingdom via a licensing deal with Lee Gopthal's B&C Records, sharing the B&C catalogue series for both singles and albums, prior to B&C ceasing to release records on the B&C label, when it concentrated on marketing instead. In early 1972, B&C brokered a deal with Precision Tapes to manufacture and distribute Charisma's albums in tape format. From early 1970, Charisma's European distribution was handled by Phonogram Inc.

In the United States and Canada, Charisma recordings were initially licensed to other labels. These included ABC Records, along with subsidiaries, Impulse, Probe and Dunhill. Artists included Van der Graaf Generator and Genesis. Elektra Records in the USA released records by Charisma artists Atomic Rooster, Audience, Lindisfarne and Jack the Lad.

In 1971, Charisma entered into a distribution agreement with Buddah Records and began to release albums on the Charisma label in the USA. These included Pawn Hearts by Van der Graaf Generator and Nursery Cryme, Foxtrot and Genesis Live by Genesis. Atlantic Records also later released Charisma recordings in the United States from 1973 to 1974 including many Genesis titles.

In 1973, Atlantic stopped distributing Charisma in America; as a result, in the USA Charisma's bands signed to various labels such as Mercury Records (Van der Graaf Generator) and Arista Records (Monty Python). Genesis records were released in the USA under Atlantic's subsidiary label Atco Records from 1974 to 1976. In 1976, Charisma signed a new distribution deal in the UK with Polydor that lasted until 1980. In Canada, many Charisma releases were distributed by GRT and PolyGram Canada.

Between 1980 and 1982, Charisma operated a subsidiary called Pre Records, who were devoted to new wave and reggae acts. Pre's roster included Scars, Prince Far I, Delta 5, Gregory Isaacs, The Monochrome Set and Congo Ashanti Roy, amongst others. Pre also licensed albums by The Residents and Tuxedomoon from the American label Ralph Records. In Europe, Pre's releases were issued on the Charisma label.

Collectable "pink scroll" label design
Most Charisma artists were relatively unknown early on, so original pressings have become quite rare and sought after by collectors. The "pink scroll" label was first used in the UK from 1969 until mid-1972. This was replaced by the Mad Hatter label, designed by Paul Whitehead. In the US, the pink scroll labels were used in late 1973 and early 1974 on releases distributed by Buddah. Releases distributed by Atlantic Records used a variation of the Mad Hatter design.

Notable releases

Albums

1: On Virgin Records in Australia, Atlantic Records in the US
2: On Island Records in the US
3: On Geffen Records in the US

Singles

1: On Atlantic Records in Canada, New Zealand and the US
2: On Geffen Records in Australia, Canada, New Zealand and the US

Compilation / sampler albums

See also
 Lists of record labels

References

External links
 The Famous Charisma Discography – Book with foreword by Michal Palin
 Collectors Website – Contains discography
 Tony Stratton-Smith and The Marquee Club
 Colin Richardson was International Manager for Charisma between 1972 and 1976
 Current Charisma label from Angel Music Group UK
 Charisma Labelography
 

 
British record labels
EMI
Universal Music Group
Progressive rock record labels
1969 establishments in England
1986 disestablishments in England
1990 establishments in England
1992 disestablishments in England
Record labels established in 1969
Record labels disestablished in 1986
Record labels established in 1990
Record labels disestablished in 1992
Re-established companies
Rock record labels
Defunct record labels of the United Kingdom